The 2011 Arizona Wildcats football team represented the University of Arizona in the 2011 NCAA Division I FBS football season.  The team played their home games in Arizona Stadium in Tucson, Arizona. This was the first year for Arizona in the newly reconfigured Pac-12 Conference; they played in the Pac-12 South Division. They finished the season 4–8, 2–7 in Pac-12 play.

The team was coached by interim head coach Tim Kish for the last six games of the season after eighth-year head coach Mike Stoops was fired as head coach on October 10 after starting the season 1–5 (their sole victory was against FCS Northern Arizona). Including the previous season, the Wildcats under Stoops had lost 10 consecutive games against FBS opponents, with their last victory over a FBS team taking place nearly a year earlier on October 30, 2010, against UCLA.  Kish, the team's defensive coordinator, was named interim head coach for the remainder of the season. Kish finished the season 3–3, including a Duel in the Desert victory over Arizona State to reclaim the Territorial Cup. Rich Rodriguez was named the Wildcats' new full-time head coach starting in 2012.

Schedule

Roster

Game summaries

Northern Arizona

On September 3, Arizona pulled away from Northern Arizona as they outscored the Lumberjacks 27–0 in the second half. Quarterback Nick Foles threw for 412 yards on 34 for 42 passing and had three of his five touchdown passes in third quarter to help the Wildcats defeat the Lumberjacks 42–10. Arizona struggled a bit during the second quarter –  a quarter in which the Lumberjacks outscored them 10–0 – after take a 14–0 lead during the first quarter. Northern Arizona's Cary Grossart threw for 179 yards on 20 of 26 passing, and Zach Bauman ran for 99 yards on 27 carries during the game. For Arizona, Juron Criner had six receptions for 151 yards and a touchdown, and David Roberts had 7 catches for 58 yards.

Oklahoma State

This game was a rematch of the 2010 Alamo Bowl, just nine months earlier, which Oklahoma State won 36–10.

Stanford

Oregon

Oregon's 56 points is the most points Arizona has allowed at home since LSU scored 59 points in 2003 at Arizona Stadium.

USC

Oregon State

UCLA

Since 1927, UCLA is ahead of Arizona 19–14–2 in this series. The Wildcats have a 10–8 advantage in games played in Tucson, including the last three wins in the Desert. This was Tim Kish's first game as head coach for Arizona. Before halftime, a streaker dressed as a referee and ran off the field, and a fight ensued, leading to two players being ejected and four Arizona players being suspended.

Washington

Utah

Colorado

Arizona State

Louisiana–Lafayette

Rankings

References

Arizona
Arizona Wildcats football seasons
Arizona Wildcats football